The Washington University Law Review is a bimonthly law review published by students at Washington University School of Law. It was established as the St. Louis Law Review in 1915, retitled the Washington University Law Quarterly in 1936, and was most recently renamed in 2006. It covers all legal topics.

References

External links 
 

American law journals
English-language journals
General law journals
Law journals edited by students
Publications established in 1915
Bimonthly journals
Washington University School of Law